Southwestern Bontoc (Southwestern Bontok) is a variety of the Bontoc language of the Philippines. This language is a moribund language, with only 2,470 speakers left in 2007.

Distribution and dialects 
Ethnologue reports the following locations for Southwestern Bontok:

Cordillera Administrative Region: Mountain Province: Bontoc Municipality: Alab, Balili, Gonogon and some villages near Chico River Valley and the southwest of Bontoc Municipality.

Ethnologue identifies Ina-ab, Binalili and Ginonogon as dialects of Southwestern Bontok.

Similarities 
Ethnologue reports the language is similar to 4 other Bontoc languages: Central Bontok, North Bontok, Southern Bontok and Eastern Bontok.

Death of the language 
This language is a moribund language, which means that only a few people speak it and if the speakers of the language continue to speak Tagalog or English to their sons and not speak their own mother tongue, the language will not be passed down to newer generations, eventually becoming a "dead language". Many of the speakers have shifted to Ilokano. Many of the speakers can also speak Central Bontok and Kankanaey as their second language.

References

See also 

 Bontoc language
 Philippine languages
 Mountain Province

Endangered languages of Oceania
Languages of the Philippines
Languages of Mountain Province